Doctor Strange is a Marvel Comics superhero.

Doctor Strange or Dr. Strange may also refer to:

Film and television
 Dr. Strange (1978 film), a 1978 made-for-TV movie, based on the Marvel character
 Doctor Strange: The Sorcerer Supreme, a 2007 animated film
 Doctor Strange (Marvel Cinematic Universe character), as portrayed since 2016
 Doctor Strange (2016 film) from Marvel Studios
 Doctor Strange in the Multiverse of Madness, 2022 film from Marvel Studios

Comics
Doctor Strange (comic book), the various comics featuring Doctor Strange
Doc Strange, a Nedor Comics character named Doctor Thomas Hugo Strange
Hugo Strange, a DC Comics character and recurring Batman villain

Music
Doctor Strange (soundtrack), the film score for the 2016 film
Dr. Strange Records, a record label and record store located in Alta Loma, California
Dr. Strangely Strange, an experimental Irish folk group, formed in Dublin in 1967

See also
Doctor Stranger, a 2014 South Korean television series
Dr. Strangelove, a 1964 film directed by Stanley Kubrick